Wir sind des Geyers schwarzer Haufen is an interwar-era German marching song. Composed around the 1920s, the lyrics of the song are sourced from the poem Ich bin der arme Konrad by the Bavarian poet and artillery officer Heinrich von Reder (1824 — 1909). The melody of the song is arranged by German songwriter and Nazi Fritz Sotke (1902 - 1970). As a song about the German Peasants' War, the song lyrics are noted for their strong anti-clerical and anti-noble themes.

History 
The song's title (translates. "We are Geyer's Black Company") and lyrics are references to Florian Geyer (1490 – 10 June 1525) and his Black Company, a heavy cavalry unit which fought on the side of the Peasants during the German Peasants' War. Geyer's Black Company was notorious with his contemporaries for their destruction of cathedrals, castles, and summary executions of clerics and noblemen. The song's lyrics capitalise on this notoriety, with references to the actions of the Black Company: "" ("Raise the red rooster [flames] upon the Cloister Roof!").

As a song composed within the broader context of the Weimar Republic-era German Youth Movements, the song was sung by many different political groups across the political spectrum. The song is notable for its inclusion in both the official songbooks of the German Nazi Party, as well as the National People's Army of the German Democratic Republic. 

In the modern-day, Wir sind des Geyers schwarzer Haufen remains a popular song performed by various German music groups. Depending on the specific arrangement and performer, the lyrics of the song may be altered or weakened. Common substitutions include replacing the "Cloister Roof" with a simple "Knight's Roof", or even omitting certain lines entirely (e.g. "").

Lyrics and translation 

Note that depending on the specific performer and arrangement, there may be differences in the lyrics.

References 

 Walter Moßmann, Peter Schleuning: Wir haben jetzt die Schnauze voll – alte und neue politische Lieder. Rowohlt Taschenbuch Verlag, Reinbek 1978, .
 Karl Adamek: Politisches Lied heute: zur Soziologie des Singens von Arbeiterliedern : empirischer Beitrag mit Bildern und Noten. Band 4 der Schriften des Fritz-Hüser-Instituts für Deutsche und Ausländische Arbeiterliteratur der Stadt Dortmund. Verlag Klartext, Köln 1987.

German-language_songs
German patriotic songs
German folk songs
German Youth Movement